Charles Watkins may refer to:

 Charles Watkins (legal writer) (died 1808), Welsh lawyer
 Charles N. Watkins (1855–1896), principal of Bannock Academy, now Brigham Young University–Idaho
 Charles F. Watkins (1872–1936), American physician, surgeon and physiotherapist
 Charles Frederic Watkins (1794–1873), Anglican clergyman
 Charles Horace Watkins (1884–1976), aviation pioneer
 Charles James Watkins (1846–1906), English entomologist
 Charles L. Watkins (1879–1966), first parliamentarian of the United States Senate
 Charles N. Watkins (1855–1896), principal of Bannock Academy, now Brigham Young University–Idaho
 Charlie Watkins (footballer) (1921–1998), Scottish professional football player and manager